Jēkabs Bukse (14 June 1879 – 12 May 1942) was a Latvian cyclist. He competed in two events for the Russian Empire at the 1912 Summer Olympics. Bukse was arrested by Soviet authorities in 1941 and died in prison the following year.

References

External links
 

1879 births
1942 deaths
People from Smiltene Municipality
People from Kreis Wenden
Latvian male cyclists
Olympic competitors for the Russian Empire
Cyclists at the 1912 Summer Olympics
Latvian people who died in Soviet detention